Ngas, or Angas, is an Afro-Asiatic language spoken in Plateau State, Nigeria. The language has two dialects: Hill Angas and Plain Angas. Retired General Yakubu Gowon is a prominent Nigerian who is of Ngas extraction.

Neighbouring languages
Bəlnəŋ, an A3 West Chadic language closely related to Angas. It is spoken by about 500 people in the single village of Langung, which is surrounded by Tal villages in the east and Miship villages in the west.

Speakers of Sur, a Plateau language, are surrounded by Ngas speakers, but Sur nevertheless continues to be a well-maintained language.

The Ngas language has also undergone extensive influence from Tarok.

Phonology

Vowels 

 Sounds /ɛ, ɔ/ are only heard as short equivalents of /eː, oː/, which are only heard as long.

Consonants

Writing system

Notes

Further reading 
 Donald A. Burquest. 1971. A Preliminary Study of Angas Phonology. Zaria: Institute of Linguistics.
 Donald A. Burquest. 1973. A Grammar of Angas. University of California at Los Angeles, PhD dissertation.

External links 
Litafin Addua: The Book of Common Prayer in the Angas Language (1921) digitized by Richard Mammana

Languages of Nigeria
West Chadic languages